Romulus was one of the mythical founders of Rome.
Romulus may also refer to:

People
 Romulus Silvius (said to r. 873-854 BC), purported ancestor of the founder of Rome.
 Romulus Augustulus, the last Western Roman Emperor
 Valerius Romulus (Divus Romulus), deified son of the Roman emperor Maxentius
 (Procopius?) Romulus, son of the Western Roman emperor Anthemius
Romulus (fabulist)
Romulus (martyr) (died 117), Christian martyr during the reign of the Roman emperor Trajan
St. Romulus of Genoa, bishop of Genoa
St. Romulus of Fiesole
Romulus, martyr (see Donatus, Romulus, Secundian, and 86 Companions)
Romulus Bărbulescu, Romanian writer
Romulus Buia, Romanian footballer
Romulus Cioflec, Romanian journalist
Romulus Gabor, Romanian footballer
Romulus Linney, American playwright, father of Laura Linney
Romulus Miclea, Romanian footballer
Romulus Vereș, Romanian serial killer

Places
In the United States:
 Romulus, Michigan, a city
 Romulus Senior High School
 Romulus, New York, a town in Seneca County, New York
 Romulus (CDP), New York, a hamlet and census-designated place in Seneca County, New York
 Romulus, Alabama, a community in Tuscaloosa County, Alabama

Fiction
 Romulus (Dumas play), an 1854 play by Alexandre Dumas, père
 Romulus (opera), a 2007 comic opera by Louis Karchin, based on Dumas' play
 Romulus (TV series), a 2020 Italian TV-series 
 Romulus (Star Trek), the fictional homeworld of the Romulans in Star Trek
 Romulus (Marvel Comics), a Marvel Comics supervillain

Transport
 HMS Romulus, the name of two ships of the Royal Navy
 French ship Romulus (1812), ship of the line of the French Navy
 Romulus (see South Devon Railway Remus class), a South Devon Railway 0-6-0ST steam locomotive
 HSwMS Romulus (27), ex-Spica, destroyer of the Royal Swedish Navy

Other
 Romulus (album), by Ex Deo, 2009
 Romulus (donkey), world's tallest donkey as certified by Guinness World Records
 Romulus (beetle), a genus of beetle in the family Cerambycidae
 Romulus (modelling kernel), a CAD software component
 Romulus (moon), a moon of the asteroid 87 Sylvia
 Romulus F.C., a non-league football team based in Castle Vale, England
 Romulus Films, a British film production company
 10386 Romulus, a Main Belt asteroid

See also
 Romolo (disambiguation)

Romanian masculine given names